The AK-257 is a Soviet 57mm naval gun, originally a land ZIF-31 L/70 57mm (Type 66/76) cannon. During the early 1950s, development began of naval versions of the 57x348mmSR 70 calibre weapon which had entered service with the Soviet army in 1950 as the S-60. This was to be a supplementary weapon for larger warships and as the main gun armament for minesweepers and auxiliaries.

The twin gun version, ZIF-31, appears to have entered service with the Project 264 Minesweepers (T58 class) and the Project 310 (Don class) submarine support ships in 1958. In 1960, two other versions of the mounting appeared; a single gun ZIF-71 for the modernised Skoryy class destroyers and the quad ZIF-75 for the Krupny/Kanin class destroyers. The ZIF designation is an industrial one and it is possible that the naval designations were AK-157 (ZIF-71), AK-257 (ZIF-31) and AK-457 (ZIF-75). In smaller warships these mountings were sometimes associated with MR-103 and in larger ones with the Yakhond (Hawk Screech) radar. The ZIF-31/71/75 mountings may not have been very successful and an improved twin mounting appeared shortly afterwards as the AK-725. The twin 57mm ZIF-31 has also been manufactured in China as the Type 66 and there is a water-cooled derivative known as the Type 76. The AK-257 is currently  employed on the Grisha class Corvette.

References

Sources

Naval guns of Russia
57 mm artillery
Arsenal Plant (Saint Petersburg) products